Akari Matsukubo (born 25 August 1996) is a Japanese professional footballer who plays as a defender for WE League club Chifure AS Elfen Saitama.

Club career 
Matsukubo made her WE League debut on 12 September 2021.

References 

Living people
1996 births
Japanese women's footballers
Women's association football defenders
Association football people from Kanagawa Prefecture
Chifure AS Elfen Saitama players
Iga FC Kunoichi players
WE League players
People from Kawasaki, Kanagawa